Marvin Schieb (born 27 July 1996) is a Romanian professional footballer who plays as a forward for FK Csíkszereda.

References

External links
 
 

1996 births
Living people
People from Ellwangen
Sportspeople from Stuttgart (region)
Romanian people of German descent
Romanian footballers
Association football forwards
Liga I players
Liga II players
CS Gaz Metan Mediaș players
CS Pandurii Târgu Jiu players
FC Universitatea Cluj players
ASA 2013 Târgu Mureș players
SSU Politehnica Timișoara players
FK Csíkszereda Miercurea Ciuc players
Footballers from Baden-Württemberg